Schaereria is a genus of lichen-forming fungi. It is the sole genus in the family Schaereriaceae, which itself is the only family in the Schaereriales, an order in the subclass Ostropomycetidae of the class Lecanoromycetes.

Taxonomy
The genus name of Schaereria is in honour of Ludwig Emanuel Schaerer (1785–1853), who was a Swiss pastor and lichenologist. 

Genus Schaereria was circumscribed by German lichenologist Gustav Wilhelm Körber in 1855, with Schaereria lugubris assigned as the type species. The genus was accepted a few years later by Theodor Magnus Fries. It subsequently fell into disuse as William Nylander placed it in synonymy with Lecidea. Josef Poelt and Antonín Vězda resurrected the genus in 1977, and included S. cinereorufa.

Schaereria is one of several dozen genera whose species were previously included in the large genus Lecidea. However, Lecidea has a different ascus structure than Schaereria. The family Schaereriaceae was first proposed by French lichenologist Maurice Choisy in 1949, but he did not publish the name validly. Josef Hafellner published Schaereriaceae validly in 1984.

Hafellner noted some similarities in the characteristics of the hymenium between the Schaereriaceae and the Pezizales, and the family was included there in the 1985 version of the Outline of the Ascomycota. This classification was later shown to be inappropriate as the Schaereriaceae do not have operculate ascia characteristic of the Pezizales. After this the family was linked with the Teloschistineae (a suborder of the Teloschistales), or the Agyriineae (a suborder of the Lecanorales). In 2018, H. Thorsten Lumbsch and Steven Leavitt proposed the new order Schaereriales to contain the family.

Description
Several characteristics unite taxa in the order Schaereriales. These include: a thallus that is crustose to squamulose; a trebouxioid photobiont partner (spherical unicellular green algae); ascomata being lecideine (having an apothecium which lacks algae and lacks an amphithecium); apothecia that are hemiangiocarpous (meaning they open before the spores are mature); and a  cup-shaped excipulum. Microscopic characteristics of the Schaereriales include asci of the Schaereria-type (lacking a tholus–the thickened inner part of an ascus tip), and ascospores that are hyaline, thin-walled, and one-celled.

Species

Schaereria albomarginata 
Schaereria brunnea  – Canada
Schaereria bullata  – Tasmania
Schaereria cinereorufa 
Schaereria corticola  – Norway
Schaereria dolodes  – western North America
Schaereria fuscocinerea 
Schaereria lugubris 
Schaereria parasemella 
Schaereria porpidioides  – Falkland Islands
Schaereria serenior  – Fennoscandia
Schaereria xerophila  – Australia

References

Lecanoromycetes
Lichen genera
Taxa described in 1855
Taxa named by Gustav Wilhelm Körber
Lecanoromycetes genera